The 2019 Liqui Moly Bathurst 12 Hour was an endurance race staged on the Mount Panorama Circuit near Bathurst, in New South Wales, Australia on 3 February 2019. The event was open to cars in GT and touring car classes, namely GT3 and GT4. It was the 17th running of the Bathurst 12 Hour, and the opening round of the 2019 Intercontinental GT Challenge.

40 cars were entered and 38 cars started, with two entries withdrawn following crashes in practice.

Class structure 
Cars competed in the following four classes.
 Class A – GT3 Outright
 Class APP (GT3 Pro) – for driver combinations with no unseeded drivers.
 Class APA (GT3 Pro-Am) – for driver combinations including one unseeded driver.
 Class B – GT3 Cup Cars
 Class C – GT4
 Class I – Invitational

No entries were recorded for Class AAM (GT3 Am) for driver combinations including only FIA Bronze drivers.

Official results 

Bold denotes category winner.

 Race time of winning car: 12:02:08.4067
 Race distance of cars on the leaders lap: 
 Fastest race lap: 2:03.5382 – Josh Burdon on lap 300

References

External links
 

Motorsport in Bathurst, New South Wales
Bathurst 12 Hour
Bathurst 12 Hour
Bathurst